Gerne (formerly: Ağılönü) is a village in the Amasya District, Amasya Province, in northern Turkey. Its population is 264 (2021).

Geography

Demographics
In 2012 the village had a population of 368 people. It has a declining population. In 1985 it had 675 people, and in 2000 it had 580.

References

Villages in Amasya District